The 1982–83 FA Cup was the 102nd season of the world's oldest football knockout competition, The Football Association Challenge Cup, or FA Cup for short. The competition was won by Manchester United, who drew the first final 2–2, but won the replay 4–0.

First round proper

Teams from the Football League Third and Fourth Division entered in this round plus Enfield, Altrincham, Barnet and Wycombe Wanderers were given byes. The first round of games were played over the weekend 20–21 November 1982. Replays were played on the 22nd-24th.

Second round proper

The second round of games were played on 11 December 1982. Replays were played on the 14th–15th, or the 20th.

Third round proper

Teams from the Football League First and Second Division entered in this round. The third round of games in the FA Cup were played on 8 January 1983. Replays took place over 11–12 January, with a second replay on the 24th.

Fourth round proper

The fourth round of games were mainly played over the weekend 29 –30 January 1983. Some games were replayed on 1–2 February, with a second replay on the 9th.

Fifth round proper

The fifth set of games were all played on 19 –20 February 1983. Two replays were played on the 28th. Holders Tottenham Hotspur were eliminated by Everton – their first defeat in the competition since March 1980.

Sixth round proper

The sixth round of FA Cup games were played on 12 March 1983 with a replay on the 16th.

Semi finals

Final

Replay

TV Coverage
The right to show FA Cup games were, as with Football League matches, shared between the BBC and ITV network. All games were shown in a highlights format, except the Final, which was shown live both on BBC1 & ITV. The BBC football highlights programme Match of the Day would show up to three games and the various ITV regional network stations would cover up to one game and show highlights from other games covered elsewhere on the ITV network. The BBC showed brief highlights of two FA Cup games from rounds One & Two after League highlights games. For the first time since the 1970-71 season, an ITV Region (TVS) showed highlights of one Second tie, Portsmouth v Aldershot. Highlights of replays would be shown on either the BBC or ITV. 

This Season ITV Highlights with the regional highlights programmes were back on Saturday nights while BBC1 Highlights under Match Of The Day were back on Sunday afternoons in the final season of the 4 year alternation deal and also the final season of ITV regional highlights

First Round Blackpool v Horwich RMI BBC1
Second Round BBC1 Boston United v Sheffield United, ITV Portsmouth v Aldershot (TVS) 
Third Round BBC1 Manchester United v West Ham United, Northampton Town v Aston Villa, Tottenham Hotspur v Southampton, Newcastle United v Brighton & Hove Albion (Midweek replay),Manchester City v Sunderland (Midweek replay) ITV Derby County v Nottingham Forest (Central), Charlton Athletic v Ipswich Town (LWT & Anglia), Blackburn Rovers v Liverpool (Granada), Sunderland v Manchester City (Tyne-Tees) 
Fourth Round BBC1 Aston Villa v Wolverhampton Wanderers, Watford v Fulham, Brighton & Hove Albion v Manchester City ITV Tottenham Hotspur v West Bromwich Albion (LWT & Central),Luton Town v Manchester United (Anglia), Middlesbrough v Notts County (Tyne-Tees), Liverpool v Stoke City (Granada), Leeds United v Arsenal (Midweek replay All regions), Norwich City v Coventry City (Midweek replay All regions)
Fifth Round BBC1 Norwich City v Ipswich Town, Crystal Palace v Burnley, Derby County v Manchester United ITV Aston Villa v Watford (Central & LWT), Everton v Tottenham Hotspur (Granada), Middlesbrough v Arsenal (Tyne-Tees), Cambridge United v Sheffield Wednesday (Anglia & Yorkshire)
Sixth Round  BBC1 Arsenal v Aston Villa, Burnley v Sheffield Wednesday ITV Manchester United v Everton (Granada & LWT), Brighton & Hove Albion v Norwich City (TVS & Anglia) All regions showed those two games 
FA Cup Semi-Finals  BBC1 Arsenal v Manchester United ITV Brighton & Hove Albion v Sheffield Wednesday (All regions) 
FA Cup Final Brighton & Hove Albion v Manchester United Live on BBC1 and ITV (All Regions) (Both games)

References

External links
The FA Cup at TheFA.com
FA Cup at BBC.co.uk
FA Cup news at Reuters.co.uk

 
FA Cup seasons
Fa Cup, 1982-83
1982–83 domestic association football cups